Todd Gee is an American lawyer who is a nominee to serve as the United States attorney for the Southern District of Mississippi.

Education 

Gee was born in Vicksburg, Mississippi. He earned a Bachelor of Arts from George Washington University in 1999 and a Juris Doctor from the Tulane University Law School in 2003.

Career 

From 2003 to 2005, Gee served as a law clerk for Magistrate Judge Janice M. Stewart of the United States District Court for the District of Oregon. Gee served as senior policy advisor for the United States House Committee on Homeland Security from 2005 to 2006 and chief counsel from 2006 to 2007. From 2007 to 2015, he served as an assistant United States attorney for the United States District Court for the District of Columbia. Since 2018, he has served as deputy chief of the Public Integrity Section in the United States Department of Justice. As of 26 January 2022, he and Lauren Britsch were the "two seasoned prosecutors from the Justice Department’s headquarters in Washington, D.C" handling the investigation into allegations of sex trafficking and obstruction of justice concerning Florida Congressman Matt Gaetz. https://www.thedailybeast.com/florida-shock-jock-joe-ellicott-in-matt-gaetz-circle-pleads-guilty

Nomination as U.S. attorney 

On September 2, 2022, President Joe Biden announced his intent to nominate Gee to be the United States attorney for the Southern District of Mississippi. On September 6, 2022 his nomination was sent to the United States Senate. On January 3, 2023, his nomination was returned to the president under Rule XXXI, Paragraph 6 of the United States Senate. He was renominated on January 23, 2023. His nomination is pending before the Senate Judiciary Committee.

References 

Year of birth missing (living people)
Living people
21st-century American lawyers
Assistant United States Attorneys
People from Vicksburg, Mississippi
George Washington University alumni
Tulane University Law School alumni
United States Department of Justice lawyers
United States House of Representatives lawyers